Unwed Mother may refer to:
 Unwed mother
 Unwed Mother (novel), a 1977 novel by Gloria D. Miklowitz
 Unwed Mother (film), a 1958 American drama film